Jane Marion Edmanson   (born c. 1951) is an Australian horticulturalist, author, and television and radio personality.  Edmanson is best known across Australia as the Victorian state presenter for the ABC TV program Gardening Australia.  Edmanson is the only presenter who has been with Gardening Australia since its beginning in 1990.

Early life
Edmanson was raised on a citrus farm in Buronga, New South Wales, near Mildura. This was where Edmanson started building her knowledge of horticulture and environmental care; including salt management and under-tree irrigation, observing her parents in the 1970s. Teaching studies at Monash University were followed by  certificates in horticulture and landscape technology at Burnley College of the University of Melbourne.

Career
After a teaching posting at Dimboola, Edmanson started at the Victorian Schools Nursery as a Nursery Hand in 1976, then moved up over 15 years to Deputy Director.

Edmanson's early career included working through a range of jobs in the retail plant nursery industry, and she became a partner with friends in the suburban Bell Street Garden Centre retail nursery in Preston, Victoria.

Edmanson has written and co-authored books on gardening and horticulture; and has written regularly for Gardening Australia Magazine. She leads gardening tours in Australia and internationally. Edmanson is Patron of the Royal Horticultural Society of Victoria, among other public interest roles.

Broadcast media
In 1989 Edmanson replaced Kevin Heinze as presenter for ABC TV's Sow What. Edmanson was a founding presenter at Gardening Australia and has continued in the role. Another television role was six episodes on Good Morning Australia in 2005.  Edmanson moved on to add weekend gardening talkback radio in Victoria to her broadcast list with 3AK, 3MP and 3AW over 28 years.

Filmography
 Hotel Sorrento (1995), Radio Announcer

Television
 Sow What ABC TV
 Gardening Australia, 1990-present, presenter
 Good Morning Australia, 6 episodes 2005

Works
 The Australian garden : a classic guide to design planting and care. By Jane Edmanson and Lorrie Lawrence. Ringwood, Vic., Viking O'Neil, 1992; 
 The New Zealand garden. By Jane Edmanson and Lorrie Lawrence. Auckland, N.Z., Viking Pacific, 1993; 
 Jane Edmanson's favourite plants (also titled Favourite plants). By Jane Edmanson. Port Melbourne, Vic., Lothian, 1995; 
 Cheap and easy propagation. By Jane Edmanson. Melbourne, Lothian, 1991; 
 Jane Edmanson's working manual for gardeners : a month-by-month easy-reference guide to practical tasks to do in the garden (also titled Working manual for gardeners). By Jane Edmanton. South Melbourne, Vic. Lothian Books, 2003; 
 From the ground up : a complete garden guide for Victorian gardeners (also titled Complete garden guide for Victorian gardeners). By Jane Edmanson. Adelaide, South Australia, Neutrog Australia Pty Limited, 2009;

Awards
 2004 Order of Australia "For service to horticulture, particularly through the promotion of environmentally sustainable gardening practices, and the encouragement and education of young gardeners."
 2013 Honorary Life Membership of the Horticultural Media Association of Victoria for "outstanding service to horticulture and the media"
 2016 Gold Laurel and Hall of Fame Award, Horticultural Media Association Australia
 2016 Golden Wattle Award, Australian Institute of Horticulture

References

External links
 Gardening Australia Australia Broadcasting Corporation
 The Diggers Club Meet Our Experts, Contributors and Presenters

1951 births
Living people
Australian gardeners
Australian horticulturists
Australian radio personalities
Australian women radio presenters
Australian television personalities
Women television personalities
Women horticulturists and gardeners
Recipients of the Medal of the Order of Australia
3AW presenters